The Price of Kings is a projected twelve-part feature-length documentary film series directed by Joanna Natasegara and Richard Symons. Each film focuses on the life and leadership of a specific world leader. The first film in the series, Yasser Arafat, released in 2011.

The films

The Price of Kings: Yasser Arafat 
The first film in the series focuses on the legacy of the late President of Palestine, Yasser Arafat. Featuring extensive and personal interviews with the people who knew the leader best, most notably with his wife Suha Arafat, the film chronicles Arafat's life from his birth to his mysterious death in a Paris hospital in 2004.

The Price of Kings: Yasser Arafat was released in January 2012.

The Price of Kings: Shimon Peres 
The second film in the series focuses on the life of the ex-President of Israel, Shimon Peres. Based on interviews with President Peres, his family, friends, colleagues and opponents, the film reveals some of the major events which occurred during Shimon Peres' six decades as an Israeli politician.

The Price of Kings: Shimon Peres was released in March 2012.

The Price of Kings: Oscar Arias 
The third film  in the series focuses on the story of the little-known ex-President of Costa Rica, Oscar Arias Sanchez. Centering on frank and illuminating conversations with Arias himself, his daughter, brother, former colleagues and critics, the film reveals how Arias gained immense popularity in his home country after bringing peace to Central America through the Esquipulas Peace Agreement and then squandered his success by running as President for a second term from 2006 to 2010.

The Price of Kings: Oscar Arias was released in November 2012.

Film festivals

Yasser Arafat
Copenhagen International Documentary Festival (November 2011) 
Dubai International Film Festival (December 2011) 
New Horizon Film Festival (September 2012)
Biografilm International Festival of Lives 
Jerusalem International Film Festival

Shimon Peres
Los Angeles Jewish Film Festival 
Biografilm International Festival of Lives
Jerusalem International Film Festival

Reception
Critical reception for the first film was mostly positive. The Hollywood Reporter praised Yasser Arafat as being "[an] engrossingly edited, celebratory view of PLO leader Yasser Arafat’s personal sacrifices during his political career".

References

External links
Official website
 
 
 

2011 documentary films
2011 films
Documentary film series
Documentary films about politicians
Yasser Arafat
Shimon Peres